Gitta-Maria Sjöberg (born 25.07.1957) is a Swedish operatic soprano who celebrated her 25th anniversary as a soloist with the Royal Danish Theatre in 2013. She has frequently performed outside Denmark, especially in Germany and Sweden as well as in North and South America.

Biography
Born on 25 July 1957 in Trollhättan, southwestern Sweden, Sjöberg first sang in public when she was just four years old. Inspired by her mother, who had dreamt of being an actress, she studied at the Royal Academy of Music, Aarhus/Aalborg and at the Royal Danish Academy of Music in Copenhagen where she graduated in 1988.

She made her stage début while still studying appearing as Mimi in La Bohème in 1987. She has also starred in Puccini's Tosca and above all in Madame Butterfly, in Copenhagen, Düsseldorf and Stockholm. Other roles have included Carmen, Elisabeth in Don Carlos, Sieglinde in The Ring, Euridice in Orpheus and Eurydice and Brangäne in Tristan and Isolde. She is married to the Danish composer and music teacher Matti Borg.

Sjöberg has made several recordings including Danacord's "Verdi & Puccini Arias" in 2007.

Awards
Sjöberg has received several awards including the Birgit Nilsson Scholarship (1988) and the Edith Brodersen honorary award. In 2004, she was honoured as a knight of the Order of the Dannebrog (first class).

References

External links
 Gitta-Maria Sjöberg's website

1957 births
Living people
Swedish sopranos
Swedish operatic sopranos
People from Trollhättan
Knights First Class of the Order of the Dannebrog